Irell & Manella LLP is an American law firm founded in 1941 by lawyers Lawrence E. Irell (1912–2000) and Arthur Manella (1917–1997).  It has approximately 70 lawyers (down from a high of over 220), and placed 183rd on The American Lawyer's 2021 Am Law 200 ranking. It has two locations in Southern California: Century City and Newport Beach, as well as one in Washington, D.C. Irell specializes in intellectual property litigation and general business litigation.

Morgan Chu, one of Irell's attorneys, is the brother of former United States Secretary of Energy Steven Chu. The firm is governed by an executive committee. Kyle Kawakami is the managing partner of the Newport Beach office. Jane Shay Wald is the head of the trademark practice group. Former federal judge Layn R. Phillips was a longtime partner at the firm. 

Former Under Secretary of Commerce for Intellectual Property and Director of the United States Patent and Trademark Office Andrei Iancu rejoined the firm in April 2021.

In 2020, Irell & Manella represented Labrador Diagnostics (a subsidiary of Fortress Investment Group, itself owned by the firm SoftBank) in an infringement lawsuit against bioFire (a subsidiary of BioMérieux), claiming the firm infringed patents purchased from the disgraced company Theranos.  This legal action attracted heavy criticism due both to the origin of the patents, as well as bioFire responding by saying they were working on COVID-19 tests during the COVID-19 pandemic.

See also 
 Irell & Manella Graduate School of Biological Sciences at City of Hope National Medical Center

References

External links
 

Newport Beach, California
Law firms established in 1941
Law firms based in Los Angeles